Otashi may refer to:
 21328 Otashi - A minor planet
 Ota City or Ōta-shi in Gunma Prefecture, Japan